Flannchad ua Ruaidine (died 1003) was the 53rd Abbot of Clonmacnoise.

Flannchad was a member of the Corco Moga people, who had by his time been conquered by the Ui Diarmata. The Corco Moga were natives of what is now the parish of Kilkerrin in north-east County Galway.

Details on Flannchad's term are few; he succeeded the previous abbot, who was deposed, in 1002.

External links
 Annals of the Four Masters

References
 Ordnance Survey Letters Galway, p. 235, ed. John Herity, 2008.

1003 deaths
10th-century Irish abbots
11th-century Irish abbots
Christian clergy from County Galway
Year of birth unknown